Sulakyurt (Sarzep) is a village in the Ardahan District, Ardahan Province, Turkey. Its population is 914 (2021). It is situated in a high plateau.

References

Villages in Ardahan District